Martinsville High School is a public high school located  in Martinsville, Virginia. It is the only high school in the Martinsville public school system. It offers such programs as the International Baccalaureate, Piedmont Regional Governor's School, Advanced Placement, and Dual Enrollment classes. During the 2006–2007 school year, a joint program, with the assistance of Patrick & Henry Community College, allowed a select group of juniors and seniors an opportunity to earn their associate degrees (64 college hours) before graduation.

Academically, the school performed below the state average during the 2010–2011 school year, failing to satisfy its Adequate Yearly Progress requirement and recording failure rates in the Virginia Standards of Learning of 22% in mathematics, 20% in both writing and science, and 32% in history. The school also experienced an increase in safety concerns during the 2010–2011 school year.

History
 The second Martinsville High School building was completed in 1939 on Cleveland Avenue, and it was used until the newer building was completed in the late 1960s. The last graduating class at the older building was in 1968.

Margaret Shumate Hadden, class of 1941, often spoke about her days there at the older building. "In high school I took the regular courses, English, history, math, Latin, home economics, chemistry and many other subjects."

One notable feature of the second high school building was a large tube-shaped fire escape, that had an enclosed circular and spiral slide inside. During fire drills, students in the upper floors would climb in and then slide down to the bottom exit. The fire escape was also used in numerous student challenges and pranks.

The original high school building in Martinsville was started in 1871. Dr. Ruffner was the first superintendent of schools in Henry County, and the first high school was named in his honor as "The Ruffner Institute", until 1904, when the school was re-named "Martinsville High School". The 1900 graduating class were called "Mavahi", short for "Martinsville High School".

Albert Harris High School 
Rev. Albert Harris, a Methodist minister, was influential in establishing a segregated high school for black students in Martinsville in 1917. The high school, known as the Martinsville Training School, became a Rosenwald School in 1920 when a philanthropic grant from Julius Rosenwald was matched by local property taxes and donations from the African Americans community. In 1945 the school was renamed in honor of the Rev. Albert Harris. "In 1958 the original building was demolished and replaced by the Albert Harris High School. When the Martinsville schools integrated in 1968, the former high school building became an elementary school.

"My teaching career began in August of 1948 at Albert Harris High School in the City of Martinsville teaching Health and Physical Education to both boys and girls, believe it or not, during that first year. Also, I headed teams in coaching football, basketball for boys and girls for two years, baseball during the entire period, and teaching driver education to students and adults. In 1959 I received a Master's Degree in Administration from Springfield College in Springfield, Massachusetts. From 1964 to 1968 I was the assistant principal at Albert Harris High School. 1968 to 1974 I was assistant principal at Martinsville Junior High School. 1974 through 1980 I was principal at Martinsville High School, retired with 16 years in the classroom and 16 years in high school administration."

In 2013, Martinsville high completed a $9 million renovation to build TV studios, 21st century science labs, a mock hospital room, and a remodeled cafeteria.

Athletics 
Martinsville offers a comprehensive athletic program and participates in the Virginia High School League's interscholastic sports competing in the Piedmont District. Sports offered include basketball, baseball, cross country, football, golf, swimming, volleyball, and wrestling. Other extracurricular activities include robotics, interact club, chess club, marching band, gospel choir, health occupations students of america (HOSA), and future business leaders of america (FBLA). The MHS Boys' Basketball won back to back VHSL State Championships in 2015 and 2016. Competing in the Piedmont District, Martinsville men's basketball has won more Virginia High School League State championships than any other school in Virginia.

Notable alumni 
 Carl Hairston – Former professional football player, Super Bowl champion
 Hodgetwins – Comedians Keith and Kevin Hodge; Class of 1992.
 Shawn Moore – former professional Quarterback, 1990 Heisman Trophy finalist
 Jesse Penn – former professional Linebacker
 Sonny Wade – three-time Grey Cup Most Valuable Player. Inducted into the Virginia Sports Hall of Fame in 1994.
 Lou Whitaker – former professional Second Baseman for Detroit Tigers

References

Bibliography
 Caldwell, Claudia Boyden. A Comparative Study of the Kindergarten and Non-Kindergarten Children of the Albert Harris School Through the Years of 1949-53 in Martinsville, Virginia. 1954.
 Cole, Richard M. A Study of the Recreational Activities of Students of the Albert Harris High School, Martinsville, Virginia. 1951.
 Fayette Area Historical Initiative, and Virginia Foundation for the Humanities. Fayette Street: A Hundred-Year History of African American Life in Martinsville, Virginia, 1905-2005. Martinsville, Va: FAHI, 2006.
 Martinsville High School (Martinsville, Va.). Mavahi. Martinsville, Va: Graduating Class of the Martinsville High School, 1900.
 Turner, Joseph Elmer. A Study of Pupils Completing the Elementary Grades at the Albert Harris School, Martinsville, Virginia Who Failed to Enter High School. 1947.
 Dedication Ceremony for Albert Harris High School, a New Segregated School for Black Students, in Martinsville, Va. 1959. The WSLS-TV News Film Collection, 1951-1971, comprises anchor scripts and 16mm news film created by Roanoke, Va., television station WSLS. A grant from the National Endowment for the Humanities funded the preservation and digitization of this collection.

External links 
 Martinsville High School
 Martinsville City Public Schools

Public high schools in Virginia
Schools in Martinsville, Virginia
International Baccalaureate schools in Virginia
Historically segregated African-American schools in Virginia
Rosenwald schools in Virginia